Kéréna or Kerana is a village and rural commune in the Cercle of Douentza in the Mopti Region of Mali. Fulfulde is the main language spoken in the village. The commune contains three villages and in the 2009 census had a population of 3,289.

References

External links
.
.

Communes of Mopti Region